The Crime Doctor's Courage is a 1945 American mystery film directed by George Sherman and starring Warner Baxter, Hillary Brooke and Jerome Cowan. It is part of the Crime Doctor series of films made by Columbia Pictures.

Plot

Cast
 Warner Baxter as Dr. Robert Ordway  
 Hillary Brooke as Kathleen Carson  
 Jerome Cowan as Jeffers 'Jeff' Jerome  
 Mark Roberts as Bob Rencoret  
 Lloyd Corrigan as John Massey  
 Emory Parnell as Police Captain Birch  
 Stephen Crane as Gordon Carson  
 Charles Arnt as Butler  
 Anthony Caruso as Miguel Bragga  
 Lupita Tovar as Dolores Bragga

References

Bibliography
 Erickson, Hal. From Radio to the Big Screen: Hollywood Films Featuring Broadcast Personalities and Programs. McFarland, 2014.

External links
 
 
 
 

1945 films
1945 mystery films
1940s English-language films
American mystery films
Films directed by George Sherman
Columbia Pictures films
American black-and-white films
Crime Doctor (character) films
1940s American films